Arnold is a hamlet in the East Riding of Yorkshire, England in an area known as Holderness. It lies to the west of the A165 road which by-passes it.

Together with the village of Long Riston it forms the civil parish of Riston.

The name ‘Arnold’ derives from the Old English earn and halh, and meant ‘eagles’ nook of land.’

References

Villages in the East Riding of Yorkshire
Holderness